Dilan Qela (born 7 August 1998) is a Kosovo Albanian professional footballer who plays as a midfielder for the Swiss club FC Bavois.

Early life
Qela was born in Neuchâtel, Switzerland, from Kosovo Albanian parents.

International career

Switzerland

Under-19
On 4 October 2016, Qela made his debut with the Switzerland U19 team in a friendly match against Denmark U19 after coming on as a substitute in the 74th minute in place of Mats Hammerich.

Kosovo

Under-21
On 30 August 2018, Qela was selected by Kosovo U21 for a 2019 UEFA European Under-21 Championship qualification match against Republic of Ireland U21.

Career statistics

Club

References

External links

Dilan Qela  at the Neuchâtel Xamax

1998 births
Living people
People from Neuchâtel
Kosovo Albanians
Swiss people of Kosovan descent
Swiss people of Albanian descent
Association football midfielders
Kosovan footballers
Kosovo youth international footballers
Swiss men's footballers
Switzerland youth international footballers
Neuchâtel Xamax FCS players
FC Bavois players
Swiss Promotion League players
Swiss Challenge League players
Swiss Super League players
Sportspeople from the canton of Neuchâtel